Željko Ivezić (born 1965 in Sarajevo) is a Croatian-American astrophysicist. 

After receiving his PhD in physics from the University of Kentucky in 1995, where he worked on dust radiative transfer models (he wrote the code Dusty), he moved to Princeton University in 1997 to work on the Sloan Digital Sky Survey (SDSS) being the principal author of the SDSS Moving Object Catalogue (SDSS-MOC). After Princeton, he took a professorship at the University of Washington in 2004.

He has co-authored over 250 scientific papers. Currently, he is the System Scientist in the Large Synoptic Survey Telescope project (LSST) and the chair of the LSST Science Council. He is also a member of the science advisory groups for the EVLA, VAO and LIGO projects.

Awards and honors 
He was elected a Legacy Fellow of the American Astronomical Society in 2020. 

Asteroid 202930 Ivezic, discovered by the Sloan Digital Sky Survey at Apache Point Observatory in 1998, was named after him. The official  was published by the Minor Planet Center on 30 January 2010.

References

External links 

1965 births
Living people
Place of birth missing (living people)
American astronomers
University of Washington faculty
Croatian physicists
Croatian astronomers
Croats of Bosnia and Herzegovina
Fellows of the American Astronomical Society